Hungary competed at the 1992 Summer Paralympics in Barcelona, Spain. 43 competitors from Hungary won 11 medals, including 4 gold, 3 silver and 4 bronze and finished 25th in the medal table.

See also 
 Hungary at the Paralympics
 Hungary at the 1992 Summer Olympics

References 

Hungary at the Paralympics
1992 in Hungarian sport
Nations at the 1992 Summer Paralympics